Beeston Long (4 February 1757 – 1820), of Combe House, Surrey, was an English businessman.

Life
He was the son of Beeston Long, a West India Merchant and deputy Governor of the Royal Exchange Assurance Corporation, and brother of Charles Long, 1st Baron Farnborough  and Samuel Long.

Long was a senior partner of the firm of West India merchants (largely trading with Jamaica), Long, Drake & Co, based in Leadenhall Street. He succeeded his father-in-law as Chairman of the West India Merchants. He was a vice-president of the London Institution and leader of a group of merchants and speculators who, in a private venture, undertook the construction of the docks at Wapping. The London Docks Company had a 21-year monopoly to unload all vessels entering the port with tobacco, rice, wine and brandy (except from the East and West Indies). Long and the other directors sat in the London Dock House, in New Bank Buildings, from where they oversaw their involvement in the transatlantic slave trade.

He was Governor of the Bank of England, a position he held from 1806 to 1808, having served previously as its Deputy Governor. In June 2020 the Bank of England issued a public apology for the involvement of Long, amongst other employees, in the slave trade following the investigation by the Centre for the Study of the Legacies of British Slave-ownership at UCL.

Long died in 1820, survived by his wife and two children.

Family
Long married in 1786 Frances Louisa, eldest daughter of Sir Richard Neave, 1st Baronet.

Further reading
Inheriting the Earth: The Long Family's 500 Year Reign in Wiltshire; Cheryl Nicol

Notes 

1757 births
1820 deaths
English bankers
Governors of the Bank of England
West Indies merchants
Beeston
Deputy Governors of the Bank of England